J. Sargeant Reynolds Community College is a public community college in Virginia with three campuses: Parham Road Campus in Henrico County, Downtown Campus in Richmond, and Goochland Campus in Goochland Courthouse, Virginia. Named for Lieutenant Governor J. Sargeant Reynolds, Reynolds is a member of the Virginia Community College System.

The college offers 25 occupational/technical associate degree programs, 9 occupational/technical certificate programs, 5 transfer programs, and 41 career studies certificate programs requiring less than one-year of full-time study. 97% of the college's programs offer at least one class through distance learning. Paula P. Pando has served as president since September 2018.

Campuses 

Reynolds has three campuses: Downtown, Parham Road, and Goochland.

Downtown campus 
The Downtown Campus is housed in a modern, high-rise structure at Seventh and Jackson Streets, having moved in the fall of 1981 from leased facilities in the 100 block of East Grace Street. In the fall of 1995 a major addition to this facility was completed, adding  to the existing structure. A six-story parking deck is adjacent to the DTC.  This campus is located on or near (1-3 blocks) many city (GRTC) buses.

Parham Road campus 
In September 1974, the Parham Road Campus opened in a newly constructed, contemporary building located on a  site in northern Henrico County. A second instructional building was completed on this suburban campus in time for the opening of classes in the fall of 1980. A three-story structure adjacent to the Parham Road Campus houses executive and central administrative offices. In the fall of 2008, the Parham campus opened the Massey Library Technology Center, named for Ivor & Maureen Massey.

Goochland campus 
An instructional facility at the Goochland Campus was completed in the fall of 1981. A major addition to the Goochland Campus opened in Spring 2001, making this the college's third comprehensive campus.  The Goochland Campus offers programs in horticulture, automotive and diesel mechanics, welding and equine management.

Academics 

The college offers 25 two-year occupational/technical programs, 9 certificate programs and 41 career studies certificate programs requiring less than one year of full-time study.

Notable alumni
Amir Sadollah - professional mixed martial artist

References

External links
 Official website

Virginia Community College System
Reynolds, J. Sargeant Community College
Educational institutions established in 1972
1972 establishments in Virginia
Universities and colleges accredited by the Southern Association of Colleges and Schools
Education in Goochland County, Virginia
Education in Henrico County, Virginia